Stassen is a Dutch patronymic surname, originally meaning "son of Stas", a short form of Eustathius.

Ben Stassen (born 1959), Belgian film director and producer
Franz Stassen (1869–1949), German painter and illustrator
Glen Stassen (1936–2014), American ethicist, professor, and Baptist theologian
Harold Stassen (1907–2001), American politician from Minnesota; governor of Minnesota 1939–1943; perennial candidate for U.S. president
J. Robert Stassen (1927–2015), American politician; Minnesota state senator (1973–1976)
Jean-Philippe Stassen (born 1966), Belgian comic-book artist
Julien Stassen (born 1988), Belgian bicycle racer
Laurence Stassen (born 1971), Dutch politician

Riley G. Stassen-Raddatz (born 1994), American machinist

References

German-language surnames
Dutch-language surnames
Patronymic surnames

de:Stassen